Evolution Robotics was an American technological company based in Pasadena, California. It specialized in robotics technologies with their product range covering computer vision, localization and autonomous navigation.

Evolution Robotics cooperated with Cambridge University for research in vision technology. Software products of Evolution Robotics were licensed by the Korean Institute of Industrial Technology and the Sony Robotics Division and were part of WowWee robots like Rovio.

On September 17, 2012 it was announced that Evolution Robotics was acquired by iRobot for $74 Million.

Products 

In January 2010, Evolution Robotics released Mint, a cleaning robot which dusts and wet-mops hard surface floors. The robot's "wet mopping mode" has a coverage of 93 sq m (1000 sq ft) and 23 sq m (250 sq ft). The Mint lacks a vacuum motor and is one of the quietest floor cleaning robots. The Mint was described as a "not fully autonomous robot" hence a cleaning cloth has to be attached to the cleaning pad before using it. For navigation, the robot uses an indoor navigation system called NorthStar. Mint used a navigation cube as a beacon for navigation, and the original model was only able to handle one of these beacons at a time.

On September 14, 2011, Evolution Robotics announced the second model of the Mint family, called Mint Plus. The robot represents an improved version of the original Mint, supporting multiple NorthStar cubes at a time. An additional feature of the new robot is the ability to continue work at the same spot if the machine is interrupted during cleaning. Mint Plus features an automatic cleaning solution dispenser that keeps the cloth wet during cleaning. One of the two Mint Plus robots has an installed docking station that has a function of a charging stand where the robot can be placed manually.

In 2013, Evolution Robotics Mint was rebranded as iRobot Braava.

References

External links 
http://evolution.com/ − Website of Evolution Robotics (archived)

Defunct robotics companies of the United States
Information technology companies of the United States
Defunct companies based in California
Companies based in Pasadena, California